Karsten Braasch and Andrei Olhovskiy were the defending champions but did not compete that year.

Petr Luxa and Radek Štěpánek won in the final 6–4, 7–6(7–4) against Tomáš Cibulec and Pavel Vízner.

Seeds

  Jonas Björkman /  Yevgeny Kafelnikov (first round)
  Petr Pála /  Cyril Suk (quarterfinals)
  Tomáš Cibulec /  Pavel Vízner (final)
  David Adams /  Paul Hanley (first round)

Draw

External links
 2003 Breil Milano Indoor Doubles Draw

Milan Indoor
2003 ATP Tour
Milan